Albertina Johannes is a sprinter from Namibia.

Johannes has competed and won medals for the paralympic team of Namibia. Johannes has competed at Namibia's national championships.

References

Paralympic athletes of Namibia
Living people
Year of birth missing (living people)